The  West Michigan ThunderHawks season was the team's fourth season as a football franchise and first in the Indoor Football League (IFL). One of twenty-five teams competing in the IFL for the 2010 season, the ThunderHawks were members of the Atlantic East Division of the United Conference. The team played their home games at DeltaPlex Arena in Grand Rapids, Michigan.

The team was originally going to be coached by Rod Miller, but Miller left the ThunderHawks for a job in Arena Football 1, and Terry Foster was named the interim head coach.

Schedule

Regular season

Standings

Roster

References

West Michigan ThunderHawks
West Michigan ThunderHawks
Sports in Muskegon, Michigan
West Michigan ThunderHawks